Alexandra Papadopoulou (born 10 April 1957, Athens, Greece) is currently the Greek Ambassador to the United States and has been in the position since February 2020.  She is the first woman to serve in that post.

Early life and education
Papadopoulou earned a law degree from the University of Athens in Greece, where she also studied political science.  As a Fulbright Scholar, she earned a Master’s Degree in International Relations/International Law from the University of Pennsylvania.

Career
Before becoming Ambassador to the USA, she served as the Head of the Diplomatic Cabinet of the Prime Minister as well as Head of the European Union Rule of Law Mission (EULEX) in Kosovo. She has also been the Greek Ambassador to Paraguay and Uruguay (12/2015 - 8/2016) and Permanent Representative to the European Union.

References

University of Pennsylvania alumni
National and Kapodistrian University of Athens alumni
Ambassadors of Greece to the United States
Ambassadors to Paraguay
Ambassadors to Uruguay
Greek women ambassadors
Permanent Representatives to the European Union
Diplomats from Athens
1957 births
Living people